Apona yunnanensis is a moth in the family Eupterotidae. It was described by Rudolf Mell in 1929. It is found in China.

Subspecies
Apona yunnanensis yunnanensis
Apona yunnanensis alticola Mell, 1937 (China: Yunnan)

References

Moths described in 1929
Eupterotinae